The 2017–18 Cal State Northridge Matadors women's basketball team represents California State University, Northridge during the 2017–18 NCAA Division I women's basketball season. The Matadors, led by eighth year head coach Jason Flowers, play their home games at the Matadome as members of the Big West Conference. They finished the season 19–16, 8–8 in Big West play to finish in fifth place. They won the Big women's tournament to earn an automatic bid to the NCAA women's tournament where they lost to Notre Dame in the first round.

Roster

Schedule and results

|-
!colspan=9 style=| Exhibition

|-
!colspan=9 style=| Non-conference regular season

|-
!colspan=9 style=| Big West regular season

|-
!colspan=9 style=| Big West Women's Tournament

|-
!colspan=9 style=| NCAA Women's Tournament

See also
 2017–18 Cal State Northridge Matadors men's basketball team

References

Cal State Northridge Matadors women's basketball seasons
Cal State Northridge
Cal State